Dorymyrmex bossutus is a species of ant in the genus Dorymyrmex. Described by Trager in 1988, the species is endemic to the United States.

References

Dorymyrmex
Hymenoptera of North America
Insects described in 1988